The 1997–98 La Liga season, the 67th since its establishment, started on 30 August 1997 and finished on 16 May 1998. On 29 March 1998, Sporting Gijón drew 0–0 with Real Zaragoza while Racing Santander, who were 19th in the table at the time, lost by Athletic Bilbao 4–3, to make Sporting Gijón the first team in La Liga history to be relegated in March, ending the season with a League record low points tally of just 13.

Promotion and relegation 
Twenty teams competed in the league – the top seventeen teams from the previous season and the three teams promoted from the Segunda División. The promoted teams were Mérida, Salamanca (both teams returning after a season's absence) and Mallorca (returning after a five-year absence). They replaced Rayo Vallecano, Extremadura, Sevilla FC, Hércules CF and CD Logrones after spending time in the top flight for two, one, twenty two, one and one years respectively. Starting from this season, twenty teams contested in the La Liga as opposed to previous seasons with twenty-two teams.

Team information

Clubs and locations 

1997–98 season was composed of the following clubs:

League table

Positions by round

Results

Relegation playoff

First Leg

Second Leg

Awards

Pichichi Trophy 
The Pichichi Trophy is awarded to the player who scores the most goals in a season.

Zamora Trophy 
The Zamora Trophy is awarded to the goalkeeper with least goals to games ratio.

Signings 
Source: http://www.bdfutbol.com/es/t/t1996-97.html

See also 
 1997–98 Segunda División
 1997–98 Copa del Rey

References 

1997 1998
1997–98 in Spanish football leagues
Spain